"Shekere" is a song recorded by the Nigerian Afro pop artist Yemi Alade and produced by DJ Coublon, taken from her studio album Woman of Steel (2019). Alade collaborated with the Beninese artiste Angélique Kidjo on the track.

Background 
In an interview with OkayAfrica, Alade stated that Kidjo had been an inspiration to her while she was growing up. The song took two years to make. The track was produced by DJ Coublon and Kidjo remixed her hit song "Wombo Lombo" on the track.

Music video 
The music video was shot in the United Kingdom and Kenya. It featured the Kenyan Maasai tribe, Ushanga women group and dancers. It was directed by Ovie Etseyatse.

Accolades 

|-
|2021
|"Shekere"
| Best Collaboration 
| 

|-
|2020
|"Shekere"
| Best Music Video
|

Critical reception 
A contributor to SoundStroke reviewed "Shekere" and gave it a 7.3/10 rating and applauded the music producer for giving a nice instrumental on the song. The reviewer also stated that "the both artistes delivered so effortlessly as though they have been singing together for years".

References 

Nigerian popular music
Beninese music
2019 songs